The Lodgers may refer to:
 The Lodgers (song), a song by the Style Council
 The Lodgers (1987 film), a Persian comedy film
 The Lodgers (2017 film), an Irish gothic horror film

See also
 The Lodger (disambiguation)